Ernest Edwin Speight (6 December 1871 – 17 September 1949), usually known as E E Speight, was a Yorkshireman who travelled in Japan and India and was a professor of English for twenty years at the Imperial University, Tokyo, Japan and also at the Fourth Higher School, Kanazawa, then for a further twenty years at the Osmania University, Hyderabad, India. In India he made a study of the Nilgiri hill tribes and was working on a Toda grammar at his death

In Speight's youth he was a friend of W. B. Yeats, A. E. Housman and George Bernard Shaw, in his latter years of Tagore, Aurobindo, Mohandas K Gandhi, and Prince Peter of Greece and Denmark for whom he reviewed some of his writings.

In addition to teaching, Speight wrote a substantial number of English textbooks, some of which remain in use in the 21st-century English syllabus in India. Speight also wrote fiction, poetry, music, and edited anthologies.

With his business partner R. H. Walpole, Speight issued The Saracen's Head Library (Mary Kingsley Travel Books) book series published by the E. E. Speight & R. H. Walpole publishing house based in Teignmouth, in Devon.

Personal life

Speight was married twice. On 11 July 1899 he married Ragna Grõn (11 July 1876 – 3 May 1953) of Norway who travelled to Japan overland by train through Russia from Norway twice with their young son Arthur, and he later married Doris Allix (10 July 1901 – 22 May 1991) in India with whom he had two sons, Peter and Michael.

Honours
Speight was awarded the Fifth Class of the Order of the Rising Sun by the Emperor of Japan for services to teaching, and was allowed this honour by the King.

Bibliography

See also
1934 in poetry
James Murdoch

References

External links
 

English philosophers
Linguists from England
Academic staff of Osmania University
Academic staff of the University of Tokyo
English anthropologists
1871 births
1949 deaths